Once Upon a Time in Vietnam is a 2013 Vietnamese action fantasy film directed by and starring Dustin Nguyen along with Roger Yuan. It was released on August 22, 2013. This is the first Vietnamese action fantasy film.

Cast
Dustin Nguyen as Dao
Roger Yuan as Long
Thanh Van Ngo as Anh
Thai Hoa as Hien
Nguyen Hoang Quan as Hung
Ngoc Diep as Van
Hieu Hien as Huy
Phi Thanh Vân as Lan
Xuan Phat as Mr. Tinh
Jason Ninh Cao as General
Bui Van Hai as Deserter
My Le as Teacher
Kieu Mai Ly as Neighbor
Diem Trinh as Neighbor
Quang Hieu as Monk
Nguyen Hau as Man on truck
Le Kham as Man on truck

References

External links

.

2013 films
2013 in Vietnam
Vietnamese martial arts films
Vietnamese fantasy films
Films set in Vietnam
Films shot in Vietnam
2013 action films
2010s adventure films
2010s fantasy adventure films
2013 martial arts films
Vietnamese mythology in popular culture